Is Survived By is the third studio album by American post-hardcore band Touché Amoré. The album was released on September 24, 2013 through Deathwish. The full track listing and artwork was revealed on July 17, 2013. The album's first single, "Just Exist", was released on July 30, 2013, and a music video for the song "Harbor" was released on September 25 the same year. It was produced by Brad Wood and feature guest vocal appearances by Jon Simmons of Balance and Composure, and Julia Blake of synth-pop band Vow.

Critical reception

On its release, Is Survived By received favorable reviews from music critics, with an 87/100 from review aggregate metacritic indicating universal acclaim. Citing the album's mature and personal lyric and vocalist Jeremy Bolm performance as the album highlights, it also received praise for the more mature ambitious approach to the band's songwriting, noting the expanding song lengths and musical variation as a sign of Touché Amorés growth as musicians.

Writing for Alternative Press, Scott Heisel wrote that "Is Survived By feels claustrophobic in the best way possible", and that "These breakdowns aren't musical; they're psychological.".  David Anthony of the AV Club noting the band's musical evolution  "Is Survived By is a transitory record for Touché Amoré, but it doesn’t suffer from this designation. As the band inches toward hardcore’s ceiling, it’s not abandoning the style. Rather, it’s merely embracing the malleable aspects"

Track listing

Personnel
Is Survived By personnel adapted from liner notes.

Touché Amoré
 Elliot Babin – drums, piano
 Jeremy Bolm – vocals
 Tyler Kirby – bass, vocals
 Nick Steinhardt – guitar
 Clayton Stevens – guitar

Guest musicians
 Julia Blake (Vow) – additional vocals on "Blue Angels"
 Jon Simmons (Balance and Composure) – additional vocals on "Steps"

Production
 Brad Wood – production, engineering, mixing
 Hans DeKline – mastering

Artwork
 Nick Steinhardt – art direction, design
 Ryan Aylsworth – photography

References

2013 albums
Touché Amoré albums
Deathwish Inc. albums
Albums produced by Brad Wood